James Colquhoun Campbell (1813 – 9 November 1895) was a Scottish-born Welsh Anglican bishop.

Born at Stonefield, Argyllshire, he was the son of James Campbell and his wife Wilhelmina, the daughter of Sir James Colquhoun, 2nd Baronet. Campbell was educated in Chester and then at Trinity College, Cambridge, where he graduated with a Bachelor of Arts in 1836 and a Master of Arts three years later. In 1859, he received a Doctor of Divinity.

Campbell was Rector of St Nicholas, Cardiff in 1839, then became vicar in Roath in 1840 and was subsequently appointed rector in Merthyr Tydfil in 1844. He was nominated Archdeacon of Llandaff in 1857 and was consecrated 70th Bishop of Bangor in 1859. After more than thirty years in this post, Campbell retired in 1890 and died at Hastings five years later.

In 1840, he married Blanche, the daughter of John Bruce Pryce.

References

1813 births
1895 deaths
Alumni of Trinity College, Cambridge
Bishops of Bangor
Archdeacons of Llandaff
19th-century Welsh Anglican bishops